The Green Palace (ᠨᠣᠭᠣᠭᠠᠨ ᠣᠷᠳᠣᠨ Nogoon Ordon) is the imperial winter residence of the Bogd Khan, ruler of Mongolia, located in Ulaanbaatar. It was also called the "Green Temple of the River" due its location.

Inside the complex is the Bogd Khan Palace Museum, housed in the Winter Palace building. Alongside being the oldest museum, it is also considered as one with the biggest collection in Mongolia. The palace is the only one left from originally four residences of the Bogd Khan.

History 

The old city of Ikh Khüree, once it was set up as a permanent capital, had a number of palaces and noble residences in an area called Öndgiin sürgiin nutag. The Bogd Khan had four main imperial residences, which were located between the Middle (Dund gol) and Tuul rivers. The main residence was the Yellow Palace (ᠰᠢᠷ᠎ᠠ ᠣᠷᠳᠣᠨ Shar ordon) in the centre. The summer palace was called Erdmiin dalai buyan chuulgan süm or Bogd khaanii serüün ord. Other palaces were the White Palace (Tsagaan süm, or Gьngaa dejidlin), and the Pandelin Palace (also called Naro Kha Chod süm), which was situated on the left bank of the Tuul River. Some of the palaces were also used for religious purposes.

Built between 1893 and 1903, the complex consisted of the main gate to the south and a fenced courtyard, a central court with the main audience hall and temple, and two side courts on either east and west. Across the street to the north lay another complex. The last structure added was the Winter Palace in the eastern court, a two-storey white building as the modern residence for the Bogd Khan. It was constructed in 1905 and now houses the museum with items relating to the imperial Mongol court.

A large monumental painting of it was done by Marzan Sharav and housed in the Zanabazar Museum of Fine Arts.

The Green Palace is one of the few Mongolian historical attractions which has not been completely destroyed by the Soviets or the Communist forces. However most structures on the eastern and western courtyard were lost, only the central court survived.

With the Winter Palace, the Gate of Peace and Happiness, the Cooling Pavilion as well as six temples, each containing Buddhist artwork, scripture and thangka, such as Naidan Temple and Makhranz Temple, the palace complex consists of a total of about 20 structures. The museum has about 8,600 exhibits and receives over 40,000 visitors annually. On display are many of the Bogd Khan's possessions, such as his throne and bed, his collection of art and stuffed animals, his ornate ceremonial ger, a pair of ceremonial boots given to the Khan by Russian Tsar Nicholas II, and also a jewelled regalia worn by the Bogd Khan's pet elephant. It currently runs its operations under the Ministry of Education, Culture, Science and Sports of Mongolia.

Images

See also
 Brown Palace
 Government Palace
 Karakorum

References

External links

 https://www.britannica.com/place/Green-Palace
 https://www.gigaplaces.com/en/article-green-palace-in-ulaanbaatar/ 
 Article on the Winter Palace
 article on the Winter Palace
 The Bogd Khaan Palace Museum at Google Cultural Institute

Buddhism in Ulaanbaatar
Buddhist monasteries in Mongolia
Buildings and structures in Ulaanbaatar
Museums in Ulaanbaatar